Bidens aristosa is a North American species of plants in the sunflower family. Common names include bearded beggarticks, western tickseed, long-bracted beggarticks, tickseed beggarticks, swamp marigold, and Yankee lice. It is native to eastern and central United States and south-central Canada, from Maine south to Florida and west as far as Ontario, Texas, and Nebraska. It grows in wet meadows and abandoned fields.

Bidens aristosa is an annual herb occasionally reaching 150 cm (5 feet) in height. It has numerous yellow flower heads with both ray florets and disc florets. Fruits are dry achenes bearing barbs that get caught in fur or clothing, thus aiding in the plant's dispersal. The plant attracts native bees.

References

aristosa
Plants described in 1803
Flora of the Northeastern United States
Flora of the Southeastern United States
Flora of the North-Central United States
Flora of the South-Central United States